Wnorów may refer to the following places in Poland:
Wnorów, Lower Silesian Voivodeship (south-west Poland)
Wnorów, Świętokrzyskie Voivodeship (south-central Poland)